The Malay and Islamic World Museum is a museum about Malay and Islamic cultures in Malacca City, Malacca, Malaysia. It is housed in the Bastion House building which was built in 1910 and occupied by the British rubber company Dunlop until 1986. The building has the English architectural elements, the rectangular shape design with deep slanted roofs. The museum displays the information about the spread of Islam in the world, important and historical Malay and Muslim figures, important Islamic buildings, artifacts, traditional dress etc.

See also
 List of museums in Malaysia
 List of tourist attractions in Malacca

References

2012 establishments in Malaysia
Buildings and structures in Malacca City
Islamic museums in Malaysia
Malay people
Museums established in 2012
Museums in Malacca